Rosamund Abigail Hanson (born 24 September 1989) is an English film and television actress who played the role of Michelle ("Smell") in the 2006 film This Is England and its television sequels This Is England '86, This Is England '88 and This Is England '90. In 2011 she appeared in British television series Shameless where she played the role of Bonnie Tyler.

Career
Hanson decided she wanted to be an actress after landing a role in a school play as Kaa in The Jungle Book. A few years later she began acting with the Central Junior Television Workshop and made her television début in an episode of Dangerville in 2003. Three years later she landed the role of Smell in Shane Meadows' 2006 drama film This Is England. In 2008 she appeared in the television series Fresh!, playing the role of Alison. She continued to play this role in the 2009 spin-off series titled Off the Hook.

In 2010, Hanson reprised her role of Smell in the television sequel This Is England '86, appearing in all four episodes in the series. She reprised the role also in the two sequel series in 2011 and 2015.

In 2011, Hanson appeared in Ricky Gervais and Stephen Merchant's comedy series Life's Too Short playing Cheryl, Warwick Davis's secretary.

She has cited Juliette Lewis as an inspiration on her acting.

Filmography

References

External links

1989 births
English film actresses
English television actresses
Living people
People from Derby